Kharqan District is a district (bakhsh) in Zarandieh County, Markazi Province, Iran. At the 2006 census, its population was 9,276, in 2,726 families.  The District has one city: Razeghi. The District has three rural districts (dehestan): Alishar Rural District, Alvir Rural District, and Duzaj Rural District.

References 

Zarandieh County
Districts of Markazi Province